The women's synchronized 10 metre platform competition at the 2018 Asian Games took place on 28 August 2018 at the Gelora Bung Karno Aquatic Stadium.

Schedule
All times are Western Indonesia Time (UTC+07:00)

Results

References

External links
Official website

Women's synchronized 10 metre platform